Giordano Bellincampi (born 1965) is an Italian-born Danish conductor and trombonist. He is the Music Director of the Auckland Philharmonia Orchestra. Previous position have included General Music Director of the Duisburg Philharmonic, Chief Conductor of the Kristiansand Symphony Orchestra, General Music Director of the Danish National Opera in Aarhus and chief conductor of the Copenhagen Philharmonic Orchestra.

Early life and education
Bellincampi was born in Rome in 1965. In 1976 he moved to Denmark with his family. He was educated at the Royal Danish Academy of Music in Copenhagen where he studied both the bass trombone and conducting, the latter under famous Finnish conductor Jorma Panula among others. He started out as an orchestra musician in the Royal Danish Orchestra.

Conducting of classical music
He made his debut as a conductor in August 1994 with the Odense Symphony Orchestra. Since then he has been a regular guest conductor with all the Danish symphony orchestras. From 1997 to 2000 he was chief conductor of Athelas Sinfonietta Copenhagen, a leading Danish avantgarde ensemble, as well as Principal Guest Conductor of the Copenhagen Philharmonic Orchestra. In 2000 he became Music Director and Chief Conductor of the Copenhagen Philharmonic, a position he held until 2005.

Conducting of opera
In 2005 Bellincampi was appointed as the artistic director of the Danish National Opera in Aarhus where he had made his debut as an opera conductor with Der Graf von Luxemburg and continued to work regularly.

In 2000 he had his debut with the Royal Danish Opera, conducting La bohème at the Royal Danish Theatre's Old Stage. His work with the Royal Danish Opera since then has included conducting all of Puccini's operas as well as several other main works, including Aida for the inauguration of the new Copenhagen Opera House in 2005.

In 2008 Bellincampi's contract with the Danish National Opera, otherwise running until 2010, was extended until 2013. In Aarhus he has also conducted a numerous concerts and collaborated with leading international names such as Angela Gheorghiu, Joseph Calleja, Antonello Palombi and Bryn Terfel as well as regularly worked with soloists such as Sarah Chang and Grigorij Sokolov.

International work
Bellincampi has increasingly worked internationally, conducting in North America, Asia, Europe and New Zealand. Orchestras he has worked with outside of Denmark include the Rotterdam Philharmonic,  Toronto Symphony Orchestra, Toledo Symphony Orchestra, RTÉ National Symphony Orchestra in Dublin, the Royal Flanders Philharmonic, I Pomeriggi Musicali in Milan, the Royal Stockholm Philharmonic Orchestra, Bergen Philharmonic Orchestra, Malmö Symphony Orchestra, Stavanger Symphony Orchestra, Trondheim Symphony Orchestra, Lahti Symphony Orchestra, KBS Symphony Orchestra in Seoul, Moscow State Symphony Orchestra, Saint Petersburg Philharmonic Orchestra, Slovenian Philharmonic Orchestra, Deutsche Oper am Rhein and Auckland Philharmonia Orchestra in New Zealand.

Performances
Works conducted at the Danish National Opera:
 Der Graf von Luxemburg (1996/97)
 The Magic Flute (1997/98)
 Carmen (1998/99)
 Don Giovanni (1999/00)
 Tosca (2001/02)
 Madama Butterfly (2002/03)
 La bohème (2003/04)
 Falstaff (2004/05)
 Der Rosenkavalier (2005/06)
 Der Freischütz (2006/07)
 Rigoletto (2007/08)
 The Flying Dutchman (2008/09)
 Festuge Classic2009 (2009/10) 
 La fanciulla del West (2009/10) 
 La traviata (2009/10)
 Manon Lescaut (2010/11)
 Il trovatore (2011/12)
 Tristan und Isolde (2012/13)
 Tosca (2012/13)

Works conducted at the Royal Danish Opera:
 La bohème (2000)
 Aida (2005)
Manon Lescaut
Il Trovatore
La Traviata
Madama Butterfly
Turandot
Die Zauberflöte
Tosca

References

Danish conductors (music)
Male conductors (music)
Classical trombonists
Italian emigrants to Denmark
People of Lazian descent
1965 births
Living people
21st-century conductors (music)
21st-century classical trombonists
21st-century male musicians